Callithoe or Kallithoe (Καλλιθόη) is a name in Greek mythology that may refer to: 

Callithoe, a daughter of Celeus
Callithoe, same as Callithyia